Santosh Singh Irengbam  (born 30 September 2003) is an Indian professional footballer who plays as a goalkeeper for I-League club Indian Arrows.

Career
Born in Manipur, Santosh Singh  begins his football career with NEROCA FC academy. On 19 November 2020, it was announced that Santosh singh was selected for I-League club Indian Arrows ahead of 2020–21 I-League season. Santosh Singh made his debut for Indian Arrows and in I-league on 20 January 2021 against NEROCA.

International career
He was also a part of India U-16 team which played 2018 AFC U-16 Championship. He was called up for India U-20 team for the 2022 SAFF U-20 Championship, which they won, defeating Bangladesh by 5–2 margin in final.

Career statistics

Honours

India U-20
SAFF U-20 Championship: 2022

References 

2003 births
Living people
People from Manipur
Indian footballers
Indian Arrows players
Association football goalkeepers
Footballers from Manipur
I-League players
India youth international footballers